Felipe Borges da Silva (born 16 November 1994) is a Brazilian slalom canoeist who has competed at the international level since 2010.

He finished 16th in the C1 event at the 2016 Summer Olympics in Rio de Janeiro.

References 

1994 births
Living people
Brazilian male canoeists
Canoeists at the 2016 Summer Olympics
Olympic canoeists of Brazil
Pan American Games medalists in canoeing
Pan American Games bronze medalists for Brazil
Canoeists at the 2015 Pan American Games
Medalists at the 2015 Pan American Games
21st-century Brazilian people